Marian D. "Cooksey" Hood  (born November 6, 1943) was an American politician who served in the Oklahoma House of Representatives from the 39th district from 2004 to 2016.

References

1943 births
2020 deaths
Republican Party members of the Oklahoma House of Representatives